Nikita Fyodorovich Pershin (born 13 January 2002) is a Russian football player. He plays for FC Zvezda Saint Petersburg on loan from PFC Krylia Sovetov Samara.

Club career
He made his debut in the Russian Football National League for FC Chertanovo Moscow on 1 August 2020 in a game against FC Spartak-2 Moscow, he substituted Nikita Suleymanov in the 81st minute.

On 5 February 2022, Pershin moved to Krylia Sovetov Samara.

References

External links
 
 
 Profile by Russian Football National League

2002 births
People from Kurchatov, Russia
Sportspeople from Kursk Oblast
Living people
Russian footballers
Russia youth international footballers
Association football midfielders
FC Chertanovo Moscow players
PFC Krylia Sovetov Samara players
Russian First League players
Russian Second League players